Live in Japan is a 1993 live album by the New York based No Wave music group Material.

Track listing
"Invocation" (Bernie Worrell) – 5:21
"Leaving Earth" (Foday Musa Suso, Bill Laswell) – 6:39
"Desert Star" (Suso, Laswell) – 9:38
"Out of the Dreamtime" (Suso) – 5:29
"Obsessed" (Ginger Baker, Aiyb Dieng) – 10:45
"Into the Seventh House" (Suso, Laswell, Nicky Skopelitis) – 6:20
"Dousongonni Song" (Suso) – 4:46
"The Receiver" (Suso, Laswell, Skopelitis) – 8:06
"The Creator Has a Master Plan" (Pharoah Sanders, Leon Thomas) – 8:50
"The Image of the One" (Worrell) – 2:28

Personnel
Bill Laswell – bass

Additional personnel
Foday Musa Suso – kora, dousongonni, guitar, percussion, vocal
Bernie Worrell – piano, Hammond organ, clavinet, synthesizer
Nicky Skopelitis – 6 and 12 string guitars
Aïyb Dieng – chatan, congas, talking drum, percussion
Ginger Baker – drums

Production
Recorded live at Shinjuku Pit Inn, Kyoto & Imabari on August 2,5 & 7 1992.
Produced by Bill Laswell

Release history
1993 – Jimco, Jp., JICK-89225 (CD)
1993 – Restless, 7-72739-2 (CD)

References

Material (band) albums
1993 live albums
Albums produced by Bill Laswell